Theodore is a suburb in the Canberra, Australia district of Tuggeranong. The postcode is 2905.  The suburb is named after Edward Granville Theodore (1884–1950), a Queensland premier and deputy Prime Minister. It was gazetted on 5 August 1975. Streets are named after people involved with the civilian war effort during the world wars. The main street through the suburb is named after Sir Lawrence Wackett KBE, DFC, AFC, who is widely regarded as the "father of the Australian aircraft industry".

It is next to the suburbs of Conder and Calwell. It is bounded by the Monaro Highway and Tharwa drive. Located in the suburb is Theodore Primary School and a neighbourhood oval. It borders on Tuggeranong Hill and the Canberra Nature Park of Tuggeranong Hill nature reserve.

Geology

Deakin Volcanics of various kinds underlie the suburb.  These are from the late Silurian age 414 Mya. Deakin Volcanics Rhyodacite and sediments are in the east. Deakin Volcanics red-purple and green grey rhyodacite are in the center. Deakin Volcanics green grey and purple rhyodacite are in the west. Deakin Volcanics cream rhyolite is in high south east parts. Quaternary alluvium is in the north lower parts, washed off the surrounding slopes.

Notes

References

 Place names search, Geoscience Australia

Suburbs of Canberra